Belle Vue Clinic is an NABH accredited premiere medical care institution that is one of the earliest hospitals established in Kolkata. The hospital is a part of the M.P Birla Group that owns and runs a large number of businesses and enterprises in the city. Priyamvada Devi Birla, wife of the late Madhav Prasad Birla is the founder of this hospital. Belle Vue Clinic had the first ICCU in the private sector in 1971 and the first centre, to start renal transplant. It also became the first centre in eastern India conducting tissue typing for Organ Transplant patients.

Overview 
Belle Vue is centrally located in Kolkata. It's one of the larger multi-specialty hospitals in the city having a 241-bed capacity. The hospital opened in 1967 and was one of the earliest to be established in Kolkata and in the greater eastern region of the country. Many distinguished personalities from West Bengal, from artists to politicians have, at various times, been admitted to Belle Vue for treatment. Some of them include the 14th Speaker of the Lok Sabha and a former Member of parliament, Somnath Chatterjee who died at 89 from cardiac arrest while undergoing treatment at the hospital. Noted Bengali fiction writer and socio-political activist Mahasweta Devi was also admitted to Belle Vue with a urinary tract ailment.

Belle Vue Clinic will set up two hospitals at Rajarhat a 164-bed general hospital and a 400-bed multispecialty facility.

Award & accreditations
 Belle Vue was acclaimed by The Week, an independent weekly amongst India's Best Hospitals, for three consecutive years, from 2011 to 2013.
 The hospital achieved NABL Accreditation for its Pathology Department in January 2011.

Departments 
The hospital has several departments: 
 Cardiology
 CCU & ICCU & ICU, KTU, NICK 
 Radiology & Imaging
 Cardiac Surgery
 Operation Theaters
 Neurology
 Cardiology Surgical in ICU
 Neurotology (Vertigo Care)
 Blood Bank
 Urology
 OPD
 Gastroenterology
 Pathology		
 Emergency Department
 Oncology & Onco Surgery
 Nephrology & Kidney Transplant 
 Physiotherapy	
 Gynaecology & Obstetrics
 Pharmacy		
 Orthopaedics & Spine Surgery
 Composite Health Plans
 General Medicine
 General Laparoscopic
 Bariatric & GI Surgery
 Diabetology & Endocrinology
 Pulmonology
 Rheumatology
 ENT & Endoscopic Surgery
 Sleep Apnea
 Mother & Child Care
 Digital X-Ray (Digital X-ray, CT Scan, MRI, Mammography, B.M.D., USG & Echocardiography)

Controversies 
On 20 December 2018, a Kolkata metropolitan magistrate issued an arrest warrant against Pradip Tondon, the CEO of Belle Vue hospital. The warrant was issued as a result of the wife of a patient- who had died while undergoing treatment in Belle Vue Clinic- moving the West Bengal Medical Council against four doctors besides lodging a criminal case against those four doctors and also the hospital CEO. She alleged that her husband Sanjay Poddar, 51, had died on 7 September 2016, owing to medical negligence on part of the hospital.

See also 
 AMRI Hospitals

References

External links 
 

Hospital buildings completed in 1967
Hospitals in Kolkata
Hospitals established in 1967
1967 establishments in West Bengal
20th-century architecture in India